Mechinat Avnei Eitan, also referred to as Leadership Yeshiva Academy in English, is a pre-military mechina which combines classical Yeshiva learning with the preparation for the service in the Israeli Defence Forces and leadership functions in Jewish communities. The mechina, the first of its kind for English speakers, was founded in 2004, on Moshav Avnei Eitan in the Golan Heights annexed by Israel in 1981.

Campus
The campus, on the moshav, consists of spacious and air conditioned apartments, air conditioned Beit Medrash and classrooms, a large Hebrew and English library, a student lounge, sports and workout facilities including a basketball court, a computer room with Internet access, a kitchen, and more.

The Students
The students come from the U.S., Canada, Israel, Switzerland, Ethiopia and other countries as well. They learn practical skills encouraging them to be responsible and decisive. They attend special programs including army training exercises, group dynamics, survival courses, treks, martial arts, etc. Students also undertake several courses that give them "an in depth understanding of contemporary Jewish and Israeli national issues. This will help them better understand and represent Israel to their peers and on college campuses."  

A high percentage of the students who have graduated from the mechina tend to serve in Sayerot, or elite units, in the Israeli army. 

While attending the mechina, students are urged to take upon themselves projects that they can work on throughout the year. Recently, students have taken up such projects as raising awareness for the imprisoned Israeli spy, Jonathan Pollard, and many other projects. Most notably is a very successful organization called Et'chem Kol Ha'derech, run by Yaakov Yitchak Sullivan ('05), which coordinates visits to injured soldiers. During the Second Lebanon War, a crew that would rush to katyusha explosions to help clean up the devastation was organized.

References

Mechina
2004 establishments in Israel
Golan Regional Council